Morocco competed at the 1992 Winter Olympics in Albertville, France.

Competitors
The following is the list of number of competitors in the Games.

Alpine skiing

Men

Women

Cross-country skiing

Men

References

Official Olympic Reports

Nations at the 1992 Winter Olympics
1992 Winter Olympics
Winter Olympics